Boti Falls is a twin waterfall located at Boti in Yilo Krobo District in the Eastern Region of Ghana. These twin falls, which come from two rivers, are referred to as female and male; according to local myth, a rainbow is formed when they merge.

Location 
It is just over 30 minutes drive from Koforidua, and more than 90 minutes from Accra, depending on the means of transportation

See also 
 Umbrella Rock
 Akaa Falls

References 

Waterfalls of Ghana